Relaks, It's Just Pag-ibig (Relax, It's Just Love) is a 2014 Filipino romantic comedy film starring real life father-and-son Piolo Pascual and Iñigo Pascual, Julian Estrada, and Sofia Andres. It was directed by Antoinette Jadaone who was also behind the films Beauty in a Bottle and That Thing Called Tadhana. It was also the debut film of the newbie artists Pascual, Estrada and Andres.

The film was given five perfect stars by the critics from the local film reviewer website ClickTheCity.com, and rated PG by MTRCB. The film was also given Graded A by the Cinema Evaluation Board. It also received positive responses from film watchers and became a trending topic on the social networking site Twitter during its first day of showing.

Summary 
The story of Relaks, It's Just Pag-ibig revolves around a 16-year-old girl named Sari (Sofia Andres) who picked up a love letter written by a certain man named Elias, dedicated to a woman named Salome. Sari wanted to meet the two under the blue moon in a beach in Leyte. She dragged Josh (Iñigo Pascual), a non-believer in love, in her journey, and also her best friend Kiko (Julian Estrada), who is secretly in love with Sari.

Cast

Main cast 
 Sofia Andres as Sari Nakpil
 Iñigo Pascual as Josh Brillantes
 Julian Estrada as Kiko Leano

Supporting cast 
 Smokey Manaloto as Manong
 Ericka Villongco as Cupcake
 Alessandra De Rossi as Mace
 Piolo Pascual as Elias
 James Reid as Edward
 Pia Magalona
 Peque Gallaga
 Alexander Diaz
 Earl Ignacio
 Cesca Litton

Box office 
The film was considered a moderate success, considering that the three main leads of the film were not relatively known to audiences, especially Iñigo Pascual.
The film ultimately earned ₱10,954,361 ($110,562) at the box-office.

References

External links 

Philippine teen romance films
Star Cinema films
Spring Films films
Philippine television films
2014 romantic comedy-drama films
2010s teen comedy-drama films
2010s Tagalog-language films
Philippine romantic comedy-drama films
2014 comedy films
2014 drama films
Films directed by Antoinette Jadaone
2010s English-language films